Saint Theuderius (or Theuderis, Theudar, Theodore, Cherf, Chef, ; died ) was a Christian monk, abbot and hermit.
His feast day is 29 October.

Life

Saint Theuderius was born in the 6th century in  Arcisse, near the modern commune of Saint-Chef, in Dauphiné, France.
He wanted to enter Lérins Abbey on the French Riviera as a monk but Saint Caesarius of Arles ordained him as a priest.
He returned to Vienne where a group of disciples gathered round him, and he established at least one monastery for them.
He spent the last twelve years of his life in a walled up cell in the Church of Saint Lawrence, Vienne, where he died around 575.
He was known as a miracle worker.

Legacy

Saint Theudère is celebrated in the Diocese of Grenoble-Vienne on 29 October.

The commune of Saint-Chef was called Saint-Theudère by the church of Vienne in the earliest days of Christianity.
The village may be called Saint-Chef today because of a tradition that the head (caput, chef) of the saint was kept there.
Another tradition indicates that the head was that of Saint Thibaud, archbishop of Vienne in the tenth century.

Monks of Ramsgate account

The monks of St Augustine's Abbey, Ramsgate, wrote in their Book of Saints (1921),

Butler's account

The hagiographer Alban Butler ( 1710–1773) wrote in his Lives of the Primitive Fathers, Martyrs, and Other Principal Saints, under October 29,

Longueval's account

Jacques Longueval (1680–1735) wrote in his Histoire de l'église gallicane,

Notes

Sources

 

6th-century Frankish saints
575 deaths